The men's 800 metres at the 1972 Summer Olympics in Munich, West Germany took place on September 2, 1972. Sixty-one athletes from 46 nations competed. The maximum number of athletes per nation had been set at 3 since the 1930 Olympic Congress. The event was won by Dave Wottle of the United States, the first title in the event for an American since 1956 and the eighth overall win in the men's 800 metres for the United States. Yevgeniy Arzhanov won the Soviet Union's first medal in the event with silver, while Mike Boit kept Kenya on the podium for the third straight Games with bronze.

Summary

The race went out very quickly for the first 200 m, with the two Kenyans, Boit and Ouko, pushing the pace. Wottle lagged far behind the rest of the field for the first 300 m, only catching up to the pack around the end of the first lap; the leaders went through the first 400 m in 52.3 seconds. Yevhen Arzhanov, the pre-race favorite, made a strong move on the final backstretch, and with only 18 m remaining seemed to have clinched the victory; Wottle's final burst of speed, however, brought him across the line nine inches (23 cm) ahead of Arzhanov, who fell in desperation in the final step of the race.

Much has been written about Wottle's technique in winning this race with virtually even 26 second splits. What looked like blazing speed at the end was relative to the other runners who were losing speed after running the first part of the race so fast.

Wottle had equaled the world record winning the US trials. Still, few had expected Wottle, who had suffered tendinitis in his knees earlier that summer, to defeat Arzhanov, as the Soviet had not lost an 800 m final in four years; Wottle himself was so surprised at winning the race that he forgot to remove his golf cap when the U.S. national anthem was played at the medal ceremony. When reporters later asked him if his failure to remove the cap, a good luck charm which he always wore while racing, was a protest against the Vietnam War, Wottle replied that he had merely forgotten and formally apologized to the American people.

Background

This was the 17th appearance of the event, which is one of 12 athletics events to have been held at every Summer Olympics. None of the 1968 medalists returned, but the four finalists placed from fourth to seventh did: Walter Adams of West Germany, Jozef Plachý of Czechoslovakia, Dieter Fromm of East Germany, and Thomas Saisi of Kenya. Yevhen Arzhanov of the Soviet Union, who had reached but did not start in the semifinals in 1968, had been dominant in the intervening four years, including wins at the 1971 European and European indoor championships. Dave Wottle had matched the world record at the U.S. Olympic trials, but was not completely healthy.

Algeria, Burma, the Republic of the Congo, Lebanon, Madagascar, Malawi, Nigeria, Panama, Romania, Somalia, Togo, and Zambia appeared in the event for the first time. Great Britain and the United States each made their 16th appearance, tied for the most among all nations.

Competition format

The competition used the three-round format that had been in use for most Games since 1912. The "fastest loser" system introduced in 1964 was used for the semifinals. There were eight first-round heats, each with 8 athletes (before withdrawals); the top three runners in each heat advanced to the semifinals. There were three semifinals with 8 athletes each; the top two runners in each semifinal, and the next two fastest overall, advanced to the eight-man final.

Records

Prior to the competition, the existing World and Olympic records were as follows.

No world or Olympic records were set during the competition.

Schedule

All times are Central European Time (UTC+1)

Results

Round 1

Qualification rule: First 3 of each heat advance directly (Q) to the semifinals.

Heat 1

Heat 2

Heat 3

Heat 4

Heat 5

Heat 6

Heat 7

Heat 8

Semifinals

Qualification rule: First 2 of each semifinal (Q) and the next 2 fastest (q) advance to the final.

Semifinal 1

Semifinal 2

Semifinal 3

Final

References

External links
 Results
 Video of the Race

 1
800 metres at the Olympics
Men's events at the 1972 Summer Olympics